Chuang Chia-jung and Olga Govortsova were the defending champions, but decided not to defend their title together.
Chuang partnered with Shahar Pe'er and lost in the Quarterfinals to Liezel Huber and Lisa Raymond. Govortsova played alongside Vera Dushevina, but lost in the first round to Liezel Huber and Lisa Raymond.
Huber and Raymond  won the final against Andrea Hlaváčková and Lucie Hradecká 4–6, 6–0, [10–4].

Seeds

Draw

Draw

References
 Main Draw

New Haven Open at Yale - Doubles
Doubles